The Atlantic stargazer (Uranoscopus scaber) is a marine, subtropical fish of family Uranoscopidae. Its body is suited for living on the sea floor, and is one of few fish capable of bioelectrogenesis, or the ability to generate an electric charge.

Distribution and habitat
It is widespread along the Atlantic coast of Europe and Africa, is very common in the Mediterranean and Black Sea, and somewhat rare in the Bay of Biscay. It is a demersal fish, which lives in sandy or muddy sand sediments along the upper slope of the continental shelf, between depths of 14–400 meters. It is not an economically important fish, primarily caught as by-catch, but is ecologically important.

Description
Typical of stargazers, its body is somewhat dorso-ventrally flattened, lacks a swimbladder, and has been found as large as 35.0 centimeters in length, but is usually between 20 and 30 cm.  Its head and jaws are rotated upward, and has very large eyes and mouth. Its body is brown in color and can have numerous small light spots, with a lighter belly. It lives to about 5 or 6 years, and females are larger in size than males.

Biology

Feeding
Like other stargazers, it is an ambush predator which lies buried under sand with only its eyes showing. It has a large mouth, with a small strip of skin protruding from its lower jaw, which it moves in and out rapidly to act as a lure for prey. When a prey item comes near, the fish lunges toward the prey using a specially adapted vertebral column to generate the force by bending 60°, which takes less than 30 milliseconds to engulf the prey. It feeds primarily on fish larvae and smaller fishes, such as gobies, picarels, and small crustaceans, but has also been known to eat molluscs, echinoderms, annelids, algae and plant material.

Reproduction
They can spawn between April and September, depending on the region, and produce pelagic eggs, about 2 millimeters in diameter. After hatching, the larvae, post-larvae, and juveniles remain pelagic. Males are slightly more common than females, but this can vary within local populations.

Electric organ
All species within the genus Uranoscopus, along with those in Astroscopus, have evolved electric organs, but lack receptor organs. These were both independently evolved, and are the only two genera within the order Perciformes to produce electric organ discharges (EODs). The Atlantic stargazer, like other bioelectrogenic stargazers, produces pulse-type EODs while feeding and when it is disturbed. The Atlantic stargazer produces EODs with the electric organ, derived from sonic muscles. In other fishes, sonic muscles are used to produce sound by agitating the swim bladder.

References

Atlantic stargazer
Fish of Western Asia
Marine fauna of West Africa
Marine fish of Europe
Fish of the East Atlantic
Fish of the Mediterranean Sea
Fish of the Black Sea
Fish of the North Sea
Atlantic stargazer
Taxa named by Carl Linnaeus